In Greek mythology, Melanthus was a king of Messenia and son of Andropompus and Henioche.

Mythology 
Melanthus was among the descendants of Neleus (the Neleidae) expelled from Messenia, by the descendants of Heracles, as part of the legendary  "Return of the Heracleidae", later associated with the supposed "Dorian invasion".

Melanthus fled to Athens, along with other of the expelled Neleidae, Alcmaeon and the sons of Paeon. Melanthus later became a king of Athens, the successor of Thymoetes, succeeded by Codrus. Codrus was considered to be a forefather to the Greek philosopher Plato. According to Diogenes Laertius who cited Thrasylus as his source, Codrus and Melanthus also trace their descent from Poseidon.

Melanthus was also a shipmate of Acoetes who attempted to kidnap Dionysus.

Notes

References 
 Pausanias, Description of Greece. W. H. S. Jones (translator). Loeb Classical Library. Cambridge, MA: Harvard University Press; London, William Heinemann Ltd. (1918). Vol. 1. Books I–II: .

External links
 Reference in Dictionary of Greek and Roman Biography and Mythology
 Reference on Greek Mythology Link

Kings in Greek mythology
Ancient Greek rulers

Family of Plato